Guramalum is a presumed extinct Oceanic language spoken on New Ireland in Papua New Guinea.

References

Critically endangered languages
Languages of New Ireland Province
Meso-Melanesian languages
Extinct languages of Oceania